San Buenaventura State Beach is a beach located in Ventura, California. The primary entrance is located at 901 Pedro Street, off the 101 Freeway.

This beach consists of a  pier that has a snack bar, restaurant, and bait shop. People often come to this beach to surf, swim, and picnic. This is the beginning of the Omer Rains Bike Trail system that leads to other nearby beaches.

Several special events take place in this place, such as the Pirate Festival, triathlon, the "Seaside Invitational" cross country meet, the State Junior Lifeguards Program that is held each summer, and volleyball tournaments.

The nesting of the Snowy plover is monitored here, and temporary informational/warning signs and fences (or ropes) are erected near nest sites during the breeding season. To help in the recovery of the bird, nonnative vegetation that threatens the beach habitat has been removed, and beach goers are educated as to the sensitive nature of the area to dunes and other sandy areas.

See also
List of beaches in California
List of California state parks

References

External links

Official website

Beaches of Southern California
California State Beaches
Ventura, California
Parks in Ventura County, California
Regional parks in California
Beaches of Ventura County, California